Sir William Ridgeway, FBA FRAI (6 August 1853 – 12 August 1926) was an Anglo-Irish classical scholar and the Disney Professor of Archaeology at Cambridge University.

Biography
Ridgeway was born 6 August 1853, at Ballydermot, King's County, Ireland, the son of Rev. John Henry Ridgeway and Marianne Ridgeway. He was a direct descendant of one of Cromwell's settlers in Ireland. He was educated at Portarlington School and Trinity College, Dublin, after which he studied at Peterhouse, Cambridge then Gonville and Caius College, Cambridge, completing the Classical tripos there in 1880.

In 1883, Ridgeway was elected Professor of Greek at Queen's College, Cork, then Disney Professor of Archaeology at Cambridge in 1892. He also held tenure as Gifford lecturer in Religion at Aberdeen University from 1909 to 1911 from which was published The Evolution of Religions of Ancient Greece and Rome.

He contributed articles to the Encyclopedia Biblica (1903), Encyclopædia Britannica (1911) and wrote The Origin of Metallic Currency and Weight Standards (1892), and The Early Age of Greece (1901) which were significant works in Archaeology and Anthropology.

Ridgeway was President of the Royal Anthropological Institute 1908-1910 and was instrumental in the foundation of the Cambridge school of Anthropology.

Ridgeway received an honorary Doctorate of Letters (D.Litt.) from the University of Dublin in June 1902. He was elected a Fellow of the British Association in 1904. For his research on horses he received in 1909 the Sc.D. of Cambridge. He was knighted in the 1919 Birthday Honours list.

In 1880, Ridgeway married Lucinda Maria Kate Samuels in Rathdown, County Dublin. Their daughter Lucy Marion Ridgeway (1882–1958) married economist John Archibald Venn in 1906.

Selected publications

Articles

Books

Arms

References

External links

Ridgeway's correspondence and papers at NAHSTE
'William Ridgeway's Two Models of Early Greece', Simon J. Cook, History of European Ideas, 2014
 

1853 births
1926 deaths
British archaeologists
British Anglicans
Alumni of Peterhouse, Cambridge
Alumni of Gonville and Caius College, Cambridge
Alumni of Trinity College Dublin
Academics of University College Cork
Knights Bachelor
Disney Professors of Archaeology
Academics of the University of Aberdeen
Fellows of the British Academy
Fellows of the Royal Anthropological Institute of Great Britain and Ireland
Presidents of the Royal Anthropological Institute of Great Britain and Ireland